WYLF (850 kHz) is a commercial AM radio station in Penn Yan, New York, serving the Finger Lakes region of New York and the Rochester metropolitan area. The station airs a soft adult contemporary fed by Local Radio Networks, and airs the syndicated Intelligence For Your Life with John Tesh program at night. The station also features news updates from ABC Radio News.

The station is owned by Tim Stratton's Stratton Radio Broadcasting, of Scottsdale, Arizona, and his 850 FLX Radio, Inc. On April 29, 2022, Stratton sold the station and its FM translator to Genesee Media Corporation for $260,000, pending FCC approval.

Transmitter
By day, WYLF is powered at 1,000 watts. But because AM 850 is a clear channel frequency, the station must greatly reduce power at night to 45 watts to avoid interfering with longer-established stations. It uses a non-directional antenna at all times. The transmitter is located on East Sherman Road (Route 22) at Sutton Road in Penn Yan. WYLF is also heard on FM translator W230CZ at 93.9 MHz in Penn Yan.

History
The station got its Federal Communications Commission (FCC) construction permit on November 11, 1981. The station took several months to build and signed on the air in 1982. It was owned by MB Communications. At first it was a daytimer, required to go off the air at sunset.  It was powered at 500 watts and aired a middle of the road music format. In the 1990s, the power was boosted to 1,000 watts. In the 1990s, the FCC granted WYLF nighttime authorization to broadcast after sunset at 47 watts.

During the 1980s, it had different call signs: WOZO and WQKA. In 1988, it returned to its original WYLF call letters.

For a time, WYLF carried the syndicated Oldies/Standards format from Citadel Media's "Timeless" satellite feed. When Timeless was discontinued, WYLF began providing local content from its own music library.  It later joined the "America's Best Music" network from Westwood One.

On April 29, 2022, Stratton sold the station and its FM translator to Brian McGlynn's Genesee Media Corporation for $260,000, pending FCC approval. In early May 2022, Genesee Media began operating the station and flipped it to soft adult contemporary as "Fresh Lake Air WYLF".

References

External links
 

1981 establishments in New York (state)
Radio stations established in 1981
YLF